is a song by Japanese entertainer Masaharu Fukuyama from his eighth studio album, f (2001). It was released on April 26, 2000 through Universal J as the second single from the album. The song was written and produced by Fukuyama, while Motohiro Tomita handled the arrangement. The single topped the Oricon Singles Chart for three consecutive weeks and has sold over two million copies. It was certified two-times million by the Recording Industry Association of Japan (RIAJ).

Cover versions
Debbie Gibson recorded an English-language cover of the song in her 2010 Japan-only release Ms. Vocalist.

Track listing

Credits and personnel

"Sakura Zaka"
Keyboards: Motohiro Tomita
Programming: Nobuo Moriyasu
Guitars: Hirokazu Ogura
Backing vocals: May Yamane, Yuiko Tsubokura, Misa Nakayama

"Drive-In Theater de Kuchizuke o"
 Keyboards: Motohiro Tomita
 Programming: Nobuo Moriyasu
 Drums: Toshiya Matsunaga
 Bass: Chiharu Mikuzuki
 Guitars: Motohiro Tomita, Hirokazu Ogura, George Kamata, Masaharu Fukuyama
 Backing vocals: Mai Yamane, Naoki Takao, Masaharu Fukuyama

"Shunkashūto"
 Keyboards and programming: Akira Inoue
 Guitars: Chūei Yoshikawa, Masaharu Fukuyama
 Strings: Kinbara Strings

"Sakura Zaka" (Nayuta Version/Instrumental)
 Keyboards and programming: Hiroshi Shinkawa
 Acoustic guitar: Chūei Yoshikawa
 Bass: Hideki Matsubara
 Harmonica: Nobuo Yagi

"Drive-In Theater de Kuchizuke o" (Nomozaki Version/Instrumental)
 Keyboards and programming: Hiroshi Shinkawa
 Acoustic guitar: Chūei Yoshikawa
 Marimba: Motoya Hamaguchi

Charts and certifications

Charts

Certifications

References

2000 singles
2000 songs
Oricon Weekly number-one singles
Masaharu Fukuyama songs
Songs about cherry blossom